Cephenemyia jellisoni is a species of nose bot fly in the family Oestridae.

References

Oestridae
Articles created by Qbugbot
Insects described in 1941